Buff ware is a type of pottery that appeared in the Umayyad period, made of fine and light, almost white, clay.

Brown on buff ware, associated with Bhirranapottery was found at Bhirrana in Hisar district of Haryana state in India. Bhirrana is likely the oldest pre-Harappan neolithic site dating back to 7570-6200 BCE. Genome scientists, who used SNP analysis to identify mtDNA haplogroups, ascertained that the Bhirrana culture'' of India was dated to 9 tya (thousand year ago).

See also 

 Archaeological culture
 Pottery archaeology
 Indian Pottery cultures
 Fabric analysis of pottery
 'Six fabrics of Kalibanagan' pottery

References 

Islamic pottery
Archaeological cultures in India